The Helmholtz theorem of classical mechanics reads as follows:

Let  denote the time average. Let 

Then

Remarks 
The thesis of this theorem of classical mechanics reads exactly as the heat theorem of thermodynamics. This fact shows that thermodynamic-like relations exist between certain mechanical quantities. This in turn allows to define the "thermodynamic state" of a one-dimensional mechanical system. In particular the temperature  is given by time average of the kinetic energy, and the entropy  by the logarithm of the action (i.e.). 
The importance of this theorem has been recognized by Ludwig Boltzmann who saw how to apply it to macroscopic systems (i.e. multidimensional systems), in order to provide a mechanical foundation of equilibrium thermodynamics. This research activity was strictly related to his formulation of the ergodic hypothesis.
A multidimensional version of the Helmholtz theorem, based on the ergodic theorem of George David Birkhoff is known as generalized Helmholtz theorem.

References 
Helmholtz, H., von (1884a). Principien der Statik monocyklischer Systeme. Borchardt-Crelle’s Journal für die reine und angewandte Mathematik, 97, 111–140 (also in Wiedemann G. (Ed.) (1895) Wissenschafltliche Abhandlungen. Vol. 3 (pp. 142–162, 179–202). Leipzig: Johann Ambrosious Barth).
Helmholtz, H., von (1884b). Studien zur Statik monocyklischer Systeme. Sitzungsberichte der Kö niglich Preussischen Akademie der Wissenschaften zu Berlin, I, 159–177 (also in Wiedemann G. (Ed.) (1895) Wissenschafltliche Abhandlungen. Vol. 3 (pp. 163–178). Leipzig: Johann Ambrosious Barth).
Boltzmann, L. (1884). Über die Eigenschaften monocyklischer und anderer damit verwandter Systeme.Crelles Journal, 98: 68–94 (also in Boltzmann, L. (1909). Wissenschaftliche Abhandlungen (Vol. 3,pp. 122–152), F. Hasenöhrl (Ed.). Leipzig. Reissued New York: Chelsea, 1969).
Gallavotti, G. (1999). Statistical mechanics: A short treatise. Berlin: Springer.
Campisi, M. (2005) On the mechanical foundations of thermodynamics: The generalized Helmholtz theorem Studies in History and Philosophy of Modern Physics 36: 275–290

Classical mechanics
Statistical mechanics theorems
Hermann von Helmholtz